The Lille tramway is a public transit system in the city of Lille in Hauts-de-France, France. The tramway is often called the Mongy, after Alfred Mongy, the engineer who created the interurban lines that make up the current system. 

The system consists of two interurban lines, connecting central Lille to the nearby communities of Roubaix and Tourcoing, and has 36 stations.  The lines were built at the same time as the boulevards linking Lille to its two neighbours, and the lines run on reserved track within the boulevards for most of their length.

The first tram line in Lille was built 1874, and the electrification of the town system started in 1894. The current interurban lines were built in 1909. While most urban lines in Lille were abandoned after 1950, the Mongy remained in service as the backbone of the public transport network of the TCC, the predecessor of Transpole. Whilst the expansion of the Metro initially threatened the trams, they were kept in service.

The lines originally terminated in the street outside the Opéra de Lille, but was diverted into a tunnel and underground terminus at the Gare de Lille Flandres, offering interchange with both lines of the Metro. The system was renovated between 1991 and 1994, and new low-floor trams were provided. The system is metre gauge electrified at 750 volts DC.

The system is operated by Ilévia, the public transport operator for the Lille Métropole. Ilévia also operates the Lille Metro, a two-line underground and elevated VAL system, and 68 urban bus routes, all of which share a common ticketing system.

Network Map

See also 
 Lille Metro
 Trams in France
 List of town tramway systems in France

References

External links 

  

Transport in Lille
Tram transport in France
Metre gauge railways in France
750 V DC railway electrification